Hector Alexander Hevel  (born 15 May 1996) is a Dutch footballer who plays for FC Andorra as a midfielder.

Honours
AEK Larnaca
 Cypriot Cup: 2017–18
 Cypriot Super Cup: 2018

References

External links
 
 

1996 births
Living people
People from Leidschendam
Dutch footballers
Association football midfielders
Eredivisie players
ADO Den Haag players
Cypriot First Division players
AEK Larnaca FC players
Primera Federación players
Segunda División B players
FC Andorra players
Expatriate footballers in Cyprus
Expatriate footballers in Spain
Dutch expatriate sportspeople in Cyprus
Dutch expatriate sportspeople in Andorra
Footballers from South Holland